Toado is a common name for a variety of species of fish in the family Tetraodontidae, including:

 Common toado (also toado or common toadfish), Tetractenos hamiltoni
 Clown toado, Canthigaster callisterna
 Smooth toado (also smooth toadfish), Tetractenos glaber
 Starry toado, Arothron firmamentum

References

External links
Fishbase list of species commonly called "toado"

Fish common names